Psycho is a Russian drama series directed by Fyodor Bondarchuk. The project is being produced by NMG Studio and Videoprokat Studio. The series became one of the original projects in the more originals line.

The series premiered on November 5, 2020 on the online service more.tv.

Cast 
 Konstantin Bogomolov as Oleg
 Elena Lyadova as Vera
 Roza Khairullina as Kira, Oleg's mother
 Vladimir Simonov as Nikolay Stepanovich
 Igor Vernik as Artyom  
 Marina Aleksandrova as Sasha, Artyom's wife  
 Anna Chipovskaya as  Lena 
 Alexander Gorchilin as Kostya, Vera's boyfriend
 Oleg Menshikov as Igor
 Yuliya Aug as Nadenka

References

External links 
 

2020s Russian television series
2020 Russian television series debuts
Films directed by Fedor Bondarchuk
Russian drama television series
Russian LGBT-related television shows
Russian-language television shows
Films about psychiatry
Psychotherapy in fiction